Robert William Gettleman (born May 5, 1943) is a senior United States district judge of the United States District Court for the Northern District of Illinois.

Early life and education 

Gettleman was born in Atlantic City, New Jersey and moved with his family to Miami, Florida at a young age. Gettleman received joint Bachelor of Science and Bachelor of Arts degrees from Boston University in 1965. He received a Juris Doctor from Northwestern University School of Law in 1968. He was a staff law clerk for the United States Court of Appeals for the Seventh Circuit in 1968. He was a law clerk for Judge Latham Castle of the United States Court of Appeals for the Seventh Circuit from 1968 to 1969. He was a law clerk for Judge Luther Merritt Swygert of the United States Court of Appeals for the Seventh Circuit in 1970.

Professional career 

Gettleman was in private practice of law in Chicago, Illinois from 1970 to 1994. He joined the firm of D'Ancona & Pflaum as an associate in the firm's litigation department in 1970, and became a partner in 1974. He remained with the firm until being appointed to the federal bench.

Federal judicial service 

Gettleman is a United States District Judge of the United States District Court for the Northern District of Illinois. Gettleman was nominated by President Bill Clinton on August 16, 1994, to a seat vacated by John Francis Grady.  He was confirmed by the United States Senate on October 7, 1994, and received his commission on October 11, 1994. Gettleman took senior status on May 5, 2009.

See also
 List of Jewish American jurists

References

External links

1943 births
Living people
Judges of the United States District Court for the Northern District of Illinois
United States district court judges appointed by Bill Clinton
Boston University alumni
Northwestern University Pritzker School of Law alumni
People from Atlantic City, New Jersey
20th-century American judges
21st-century American judges